The Concierto del Sur  (Spanish: Concerto of the South) is a concerto for classical guitar and orchestra written by the Mexican composer Manuel M. Ponce. The concerto was written for the Spanish guitarist Andrés Segovia, who premiered it in 1941.

Structure
The concerto consists of three movements:

 Allegro moderato
 Andante
 Allegro moderato e festivo

Recordings
 The Segovia Collection, Vol. 2: Ponce, Rodrigo, Torroba. Andrés Segovia (guitar), Symphony of the Air, Enrique Jordá. BMG, 1987
 John Williams: The Great Guitar Concertos. John Williams (guitar), London Symphony Orchestra, André Previn. CBS, 1989
 Rodrigo: Concierto de Aranjuez / Villa‐Lobos: Concerto for Guitar / Ponce: Concierto del sur. Sharon Isbin (guitar), New York Philharmonic, José Serebrier. Warner Classics, 2005

External links
Concierto del Sur / OTRVE

References

Guitar concertos